Continuity or continuous may refer to:

Mathematics 
 Continuity (mathematics), the opposing concept to discreteness; common examples include
 Continuous probability distribution or random variable in probability and statistics
 Continuous game, a generalization of games used in game theory
 Law of Continuity, a heuristic principle of Gottfried Leibniz
 Continuous function, in particular:
 Continuity (topology), a generalization to functions between topological spaces
 Scott continuity, for functions between posets
 Continuity (set theory), for functions between ordinals
 Continuity (category theory), for functors
 Graph continuity, for payoff functions in game theory
 Continuity theorem may refer to one of two results:
 Lévy's continuity theorem, on random variables
 Kolmogorov continuity theorem, on stochastic processes
 In geometry:
 Parametric continuity, for parametrised curves
 Geometric continuity, a concept primarily applied to the conic sections and related shapes
 In probability theory
 Continuous stochastic process

Science 
 Continuity equations applicable to conservation of mass, energy, momentum, electric charge and other conserved quantities
 Continuity test for an unbroken electrical path in an electronic circuit or connector
 In materials science:
 a colloidal system, consists of a dispersed phase evenly intermixed with a continuous phase
 a continuous wave, an electromagnetic wave of constant amplitude and frequency

Entertainment
 Continuity (broadcasting), messages played by broadcasters between programs
 Continuity editing, a form of film editing that combines closely related shots into a sequence highlighting plot points or consistencies
 Continuity (fiction), consistency of plot elements, such as characterization, location, and costuming, within a work of fiction (this is a mass noun)
 Continuity (setting), one of several similar but distinct fictional universes in a broad franchise of related works (this is a count noun)
 "Continuity" or continuity script, the precursor to a film screenplay

Other uses 
 Continuity (Apple), a set of features introduced by Apple
 Continuity of operations (disambiguation)
 Continuous and progressive aspects in linguistics
 Business continuity
 Health care continuity
 Continuity in architecture (part of complementary architecture)

See also
 Continuum (disambiguation)
 Contiguity (disambiguation)